Tamarix usneoides, locally known as wild tamarisk, is a twiggy shrub or small evergreen tree that grows in saline habitats, semi-deserts and karroid areas in southern Africa. It has a short trunk, thin branches usually growing from ground level, tiny scale-like leaves and spikes of creamy-white flowers.

Description
It usually branches from the base and often grows in clumps. The trunk is greyish-brown and rough, with longitudinal fissures. The greyish-green leaves are minute and scale-like, overlapping each other and clasping the stem. The inflorescences can be loose or dense sprays of small flowers in the leaf axils or forming racemes at the tips of the shoots. Each individual flower is small and creamy-white, with a persistent corolla. The fruits are capsules containing many tiny seeds.

Distribution and habitat
Tamarix usneoides is native to Namibia and the southwestern part of South Africa, where it occurs in the provinces of Northern Cape, Western Cape and Eastern Cape. In saline locations it often grows in association with the shrub Suaeda fruticosa and the grass Odyssea paucinervis. In the Namib Desert it occurs beside ephemeral watercourses where it grows with Faidherbia albida and species of Ficus.

References

External links
 

usneoides
Flora of South Africa
Taxa named by Alexander von Bunge